The 1947 Glazier–Higgins–Woodward tornadoes were a series of related tornadoes spawned by a single supercell that swept through the U.S. states of Texas, Oklahoma, and Kansas on Wednesday, April 9, 1947. Most of the damage and all the deaths are still blamed on one large F5 tornado, known as the Glazier–Higgins–Woodward Tornado, that traveled nearly 125 miles from Texas to Oklahoma. This event was often compared to the Tri-State Tornado, because it was originally thought to have left a 219-mile path, but it is now believed to have been part of a family of eight or nine tornadoes.

Event description

The tornadoes began in Texas, the first of which was an F2 that occurred in the White Deer area. That tornado derailed a train, damaged several homes, and destroyed outbuildings. Three people were injured by this tornado. One farmhouse was lifted into the air and set back down onto its foundation. After the White Deer tornado dissipated, a second tornado touched down near Pampa, remaining over open fields and causing no damage before dissipating.

A third tornado developed near Canadian and passed near Miami. This large multiple-vortex F5 storm would become the main killer tornado of the event. It first impacted a railway station near the small community of Codman, where one person was killed and work cars were thrown from the tracks. Several farms in the area sustained glancing blows from the tornado, though trees in the center-most part of the circulation were reportedly debarked. When it struck the tiny town of Glazier, it may have been as much as two miles (3 km) wide. Most structures in town were swept completely away and scattered. Vehicles in the area were thrown hundreds of yards and mangled, shrubbery was debarked, and ground scouring occurred. Glazier was considered completely destroyed, with 17 dead, a major percentage of the populace. Press reports told of two people who were known to be together in Glazier before the tornado struck were found three miles (5 km) apart afterward. The tornado maintained its intensity as it slammed into Higgins, Texas, on the Texas-Oklahoma border, which was also devastated. The accepted death toll here was 51; again, a major fraction of the residents of the town were killed or injured. Much of downtown Higgins was completely demolished, and entire rows of homes were swept away. At one residence, a 4½-ton lathe was reportedly ripped from its anchors and broken in half.

The tornado was at its worst in Oklahoma—this was the deadliest storm in that state's tornado-troubled history. Six more people were killed when the tornado swept away farms south of Shattuck, Gage, and Fargo.  The tornado then moved into Woodward, where it devastated the town and killed an estimated 107 people. The damage that occurred in Woodward was catastrophic. There, the tornado was two miles (3 km) wide and destroyed 100 city blocks. Many homes and businesses were leveled or swept away, and as the tornado struck the town's power plant, a 20-ton steel boiler tank was lofted and thrown a block and a half. Large trees sustained severe debarking as well. The tornado finally dissipated in Woods County, west of Alva, Oklahoma, while the tornado family it belonged to pressed on to Kansas. 

The parent supercell continued through parts of Oklahoma and into Kansas, producing tornadoes intermittently along the way before dissipating near Topeka, Kansas. Most of these tornadoes were about F2 in intensity and affected rural areas. However, one tornado near Fowler, Kansas reached F4 intensity, sweeping away two homes and injuring 3 people. Cleanup in the region was made more difficult because of cold and snow that followed the tornado. The Glazier-Higgins-Woodward tornado was the 6th deadliest in U.S. history, killing 181 and injuring 970.  This became the deadliest tornado in Oklahoma history.

Joan Gay Croft disappearance 
Four-year-old Joan Gay Croft and her sister Jerri were among refugees taking shelter in a basement hallway of the Woodward hospital. As officials sent the injured to different hospitals in the area, two men took Joan away, saying they were taking her to Oklahoma City. She was never seen again. Over the years, several women have come forth saying they suspect they might be Joan, although none of the claims have been verified. She is likely deceased.

Damage totals from the Red Cross
A US Weather Bureau report on the Woodward, Oklahoma Tornado of April 9, 1947 gives the following figures on the damage caused in its "Original Summary" section.
Lipscomb County, Texas – 36 homes flattened, 1 damaged
Hemphill County, Texas – 83 homes leveled, 116 damaged
Texas total – $1,505,000
Ellis County, Oklahoma – $1,264,000
52 homes destroyed, 133 damaged
223 other buildings destroyed, 107 damaged
Woodward County, Oklahoma – $6,608,750
430 homes destroyed, 650 damaged
925 other buildings destroyed, 975 damaged
Woods County, Oklahoma – $950,000
25 homes destroyed, 34 damaged
110 other buildings destroyed, 90 damaged
Kansas total – $200,000

Total damage estimates were $747,850,050–$173,489,564 (2008 dollars).

See also
Tornadoes of 1947

References

 Grazulis, Thomas P. (1993). Significant Tornadoes 1680–1991, A Chronology and Analysis of Events. The Tornado Project of Environmental Films.  (hardcover)
 Bedard, Richard (1997). In the Shadow of the Tornado. Gilco Publishing.  (paperback)
 Sanders, Kellie R., “‘The Wednesday Monster’: The Glazier-Higgins-Woodward F5 Tornado of April 9, 1947,” Panhandle-Plains Historical Review, 80 (2008), 23–44.Total damage estimates were $747,850,050–$173,489,564 (2008 dollars).

External links and sources
 Top Ten US Killer Tornadoes – #6 The Woodward Tornado
 The Woodward Tornado of April 9, 1947 (NWS Norman, OK)
 (http://www.usgennet.org/usa/ok/county/ellis/intro.html)
 (http://docs.lib.noaa.gov/rescue/mwr/075/mwr-075-04-0070.pdf)
 April 9, 1947 – The Woodward Tornado (Shawn Schuman)
 Glazier & Higgins TX, Woodward OK Devastating Tornado, Apr 1947

April 1947 events in the United States
F5 tornadoes
1940s missing person cases
Glazier-higgins-woodward Tornadoes, 1947
1947 in Texas
1947 in Oklahoma
Barber County, Kansas
Kingman County, Kansas
Tornadoes of 1947
Tornadoes in Kansas
Tornadoes in Oklahoma
Tornadoes in Texas